The Valea Muntelui is a left tributary of the river Talna in Romania. It flows into the Talna in Orașu Nou.

References

Rivers of Romania
Rivers of Satu Mare County